Juan Muñoz Bejarano (1610-1670s) was a Spanish military officer and politician, who served during the Viceroyalty of Peru as Alcalde, Regidor and Procurador General of Buenos Aires.

Biography 

Born in Buenos Aires, was the son of Alonso Muñoz Bejarano and María López Palomo, a Spanish family from Trujillo, Peru. He was married to Catalina Rocha, born in the city, daughter of Antonio de Rocha Lobo Sarmiento, a Portuguese settler born in Viana, and Maria de Encinas Roxas, belonging to a Creole family of Portuguese origin.

He held the honorary positions of Captain of Infantry, attorney general and faithful executor of the Buenos Aires Cabildo. And exercised during three periods the position of alcalde de la hermandad. In 1664, he held the position of interim mayor of Buenos Aires, replacing Juan del Pozo y Silva.

On August 29, 1635, Juan Muñoz received land grants in the town of Magdalena, and was encomendero of the Chanas and Tubichamim tribes.

References

External links 
archive.org - Registro estadística de la provincia de Buenos Aires
iaa.fadu.uba.ar

1610 births
1670s deaths
Spanish colonial governors and administrators
People from Buenos Aires
17th-century Spanish military personnel